Khira mohan  is a creamish dessert popular in Odisha . It is made from chhena and syrup made of sugar. The descendant of khira mohana probably was Odia Rasgulla the food historians from Odisha suggest that the Khira mohana was invented in Odisha to offer the goddess Lakshmi at Jagannath Temple, Puri.

Khir Mohana or Khirmohan is also called Brown Rasogolla.

Khirmohan is also very popular from Chauparan, Jharkhand and there are more than dozen shops are available at Chauparan which offer Khirmohan Sweets.

See also
 List of Indian sweets and desserts

References

Indian desserts
Odia cuisine
Indian cheese dishes
Vegetarian dishes of India